The following is a list of all songs recorded and performed by the Swedish pop group ABBA, alphabetised by the English title of the song.

References

 
ABBA